Mansfield is a town in Tolland County, Connecticut, United States.  The population was 25,892 at the 2020 census.

Pequot and Mohegan people lived in this region for centuries before the arrival of English settler-immigrants in the late 17th century. Mansfield was incorporated in October 1702 from the Town of Windham, in Hartford County. The community was named after Major Moses Mansfield, a part owner of the town site. When Windham County was formed on 12 May 1726, Mansfield then became part of that county.  A century later, at a town meeting on 3 April 1826, selectmen voted to ask the General Assembly to annex Mansfield to Tolland County.  That occurred the following year.

The town of Mansfield contains the community of Storrs, which is home to the main campus of the University of Connecticut and the associated Connecticut Repertory Theatre.

History
English settler-immigrants arrived in the area that is now Mansfield in the late 17th century. The Town of Mansfield was legally incorporated in 1702, and the Storrs family history dates back to that time. Samuel Storrs migrated from Nottinghamshire, England to Massachusetts in 1663, then moving to the area in 1698.

The first silk mill in the United States was constructed in Mansfield and financed by Pilgrim descendant William Fisk. The town, along with neighboring Willimantic, played an important role in the manufacture of thread and other textiles. Though nothing but the foundation remains of the mill, Mansfield has held onto several other historic landmarks. A fully intact gristmill, dating to 1835, the Gurleyville Gristmill is the only one of its kind in Connecticut. Built on the Fenton River, this stone grist mill remains intact with the original equipment. There are tours available May through October. The adjacent miller's house is the birthplace of former Connecticut governor Wilbur L. Cross, (1931 to 1939).More recent yet rare nonetheless, the Mansfield Drive-in, a drive-in movie theater, and Lucky Strike Lanes, a duckpin bowling alley, are among the last of their breed in the nation, with only 41 congress-certified alleys currently (2016), down from 450 in 1963.

Four years later, the former director and a once staunch advocate of the school declared, "The Mansfield Training School is closed: the swamp has finally been drained." Since then, the site has been allowed to deteriorate, though the University of Connecticut has been slowly finding uses for and fixing up many of the buildings. The school, with its eerie overturned wheelchairs and neo-classical hospital, remains a magnet for adventurous locals, the police, and amateur photographers.

Located directly across U.S. Route 44 from the Mansfield Training School is the Donald T. Bergin Correctional Institution, which closed in August 2011. The Level 2 facility housed approximately 1,000 inmates. It served as a pre-release center for inmates who were approaching the end of their sentence or a period of supervised community placement.

Development has increased in recent years, leading to the imposition of a temporary moratorium on new subdivisions, as well as additional land acquisition. Mansfield enjoys a moderate amount of protected open space, notably Mansfield Hollow State Park, eight town parks and preserves, and numerous Joshua's Trust properties, in addition to university holdings. Three large farms operate within Mansfield, including Mountain Dairy, which has been producing and processing milk under the stewardship of one family since 1871. In contrast to many municipalities, Mansfield is actively pursuing a program of smart growth through the construction of a livable downtown.

On the Northeastern edge of town (Mount Hope Village), the playwright, actor and producer Willard Mack owned a large estate (originally built by William Fisk). Mack permitted his other various friends and associates to board and breed their thoroughbreds on his property.  One of these, boxing legend Jack Dempsey, made continual use of these facilities until Mack's death in the mid-1930s. During Mack's stewardship of this property, the famous Arabian Stallion "Broomstick", sire of numerous Kentucky Derby and Triple Crown winning thoroughbreds, was also a temporary resident. The property has since been purchased and maintained by private owners.

Infrastructure 
U.S. Route 6 passes through the southern part of Mansfield as an isolated stretch of divided highway, part of the planned but never realized interstate between Hartford, Connecticut and Providence, Rhode Island. Construction began midway between Hartford and Providence, far removed from population centers. When opposition arose and complications developed, the project was shelved, with only stranded parts of the highway completed.

Free community wireless Internet access is available at the Mansfield Community Center, the Mansfield Town Hall, the Mansfield Senior Center, and the Mansfield Public Library.

On the National Register of Historic Places
Farwell Barn, Horsebarn Hill Rd.    
Gurleyville Historic District, on Gurleyville and Chaffeeville Rds.
Mansfield Center Cemetery, jct. of Storrs and Cemetery Rds.  
Mansfield Center Historic District, Storrs Rd.  
Mansfield Hollow Historic District, 86-127 Mansfield Hollow Rd.  
Mansfield Training School and Hospital, jct. of Route 32 & U.S. Route 44  
University of Connecticut Historic District-Connecticut Agricultural School, roughly Route 195/Storrs Rd. at North Eagleville Rd.

Notable people
 Elijah Porter Barrows (1807–1888), clergyman and writer; born in Mansfield
 William Bonin (1947–1996), serial killer and rapist; lived in Mansfield
 Wilbur Lucius Cross (1862–1948), well-known literary critic and Governor of Connecticut from 1931 to 1939; born in Mansfield
 Charles Davis (1789–1863), Associate Justice of the Vermont Supreme Court; born in Mansfield
 Dorothy Goodwin (1914–2007), Connecticut state representative and advocate for public education; lived in Mansfield
 Benjamin Hanks (1755–1824), goldsmith, instrument maker, and first maker of bronze cannons and church bells in America; born in Mansfield
 George S. Moulton (1829–1882), businessman, Connecticut State Representative and State Senator; born in Mansfield
 Charles Emory Smith (1842–1908), Postmaster General, US Ambassador to Russia and newspaper editor; born in Mansfield
 Peter Tork (1942–2019), actor and musician, best known as a member of The Monkees; lived and died in Mansfield
 Annie E. Vinton (1869–1961), postmistress and politician; lived most of her life in the Eagleville district of Mansfield

 Henry Kirke White Welch (1821-1870), lawyer and politician
 Lyle Yorks (born 1970), retired midfielder in soccer; born in Mansfield

In the media
For the most part, Mansfield is a safe place. In 2005, Slate named Storrs "America's Best Place to Avoid Death Due to Natural Disaster."

Geography

According to the United States Census Bureau, the town has a total area of 45.5 square miles (117.8 km), of which, 44.5 square miles (115.2 km) of it is land and 1.0 square miles (2.7 km) of it (2.26%) is water. Mansfield Hollow Lake rests on the border between Mansfield and Willimantic.

Settlements
Atwoodville
Bassettsville
Celeron Square
Conantville
Dunhamtown
Eagleville
Four Corners
Freedom Green
Gurleyville
Holinko-Hunting Lodge
Industrial Tract
Mansfield Center
Mansfield Depot
Mansfield Hollow
Merrow
Mount Hope
Perkins Corner
Spring Hill
Storrs
Wormwood Hill

Demographics 

As of the census of 2000, there were 20,720 people, 5,291 households, and 3,121 families residing in the town. Mansfield's population increased 27.5% between 2000 and 2010, making it the second fastest-growing municipality in Connecticut for that period after Oxford. The ethnic makeup of the town was 83.91% White, 4.87% African American, 0.20% Native American, 7.15% Asian, 0.05% Pacific Islander, 1.88% from other races, and 1.94% from two or more races. Hispanics or Latinos of any race were 4.31% of the population.

There were 5,291 households, out of which 28.1% had children under the age of 18 living with them, 48.4% were married couples living together, 7.7% had a female householder with no husband present, and 41.0% were non-families. 27.0% of all households were made up of individuals, and 10.3% had someone living alone who was 65 years of age or older.  The average household size was 2.40 and the average family size was 2.92.

The age distribution, heavily influenced by UConn, is 13.3% under 18, 44.8% from 18 to 24, 18.9% from 25 to 44, 14.1% from 45 to 64, and 8.9% who were 65 years or older.  The median age was 22 years. For every 100 females, there were 98.1 males.  For every 100 females age 18 and over, there were 96.4 males.

The median income for a household in the town was $48,888, and the median income for a family was $69,661. Males had a median income of $42,154 versus $32,292 for females. The per capita income for the town was $18,094.  About 4.7% of families and 14.2% of the population were below the poverty line, including 6.7% of those under age 18 and 5.5% of those age 65 or over.

Education

Elementary and middle school-aged residents attend schools in the Mansfield School District.

Two elementary campuses temporarily serve separate sections of Mansfield:
 Annie E. Vinton School
 Dorothy C. Goodwin School

All of Mansfield is zoned to Mansfield Middle School, the 2007–2008 Connecticut Association of Schools (CAS) School of the Year, and Mansfield Elementary School. Both Annie E. Vinton School and Dorothy C. Goodwin school have been rebranded to be separate campuses of Mansfield Elementary School until the completion of the new Mansfield Elementary School building which replaced Southeast Elementary School.

High school-aged residents attend E.O. Smith High School of the Regional School District 19.

References

External links 

Town of Mansfield Official Web Site
Town of Mansfield Official GIS Maps and Property Information
Mansfield Historical Society
Discover Mansfield

 
Towns in Tolland County, Connecticut
Towns in Connecticut
1702 establishments in Connecticut
Greater Hartford